Mictopsichia miocentra is a species of moth of the family Tortricidae. It is found in Brazil.

References

Moths described in 1920
Mictopsichia